Land of the Midnight Sun is the debut album by jazz fusion guitarist Al Di Meola, released in 1976.

Track listing

Personnel 
 Al Di Meola – guitars, synthesizer, percussion, vocals
 Chick Corea – piano, marimba (6)
 Barry Miles – keyboards, synthesizer (2, 5)
 Stanley Clarke – bass guitar, vocals (4)
 Anthony Jackson – bass guitar (1, 2)
 Jaco Pastorius – bass guitar (5)
 Steve Gadd – drums (1)
 Alphonse Mouzon – drums (5)
 Lenny White – drums (2)
 Mingo Lewis – percussion (1, 2, 4, 5)
 Patty Buyukas – vocals (4)

Chart performance

References

Al Di Meola albums
1976 debut albums
Columbia Records albums